Fairview Heights is a city in St. Clair County, Illinois, United States within Greater St. Louis. It is an eastern suburb of St. Louis. The population was 17,078 at the 2010 census. Fairview Heights is a dominant shopping center for Greater St. Louis and Southern Illinois and includes numerous shopping plazas and St. Clair Square mall. Venture Stores opened its first discount department store in 1970 in Fairview Heights at the northwest corner of Illinois Street (Illinois State Route 159) and Lincoln Trail, which was U.S. Route 50 at the time.

Geography

Demographics

At the 2000 census there were 15,034 people, 6,026 households, and 4,206 families living in the city. The racial makeup of the city was 78.40% White, 17.07% African American, 0.17% Native American, 2.14% Asian, 0.01% Pacific Islander, 0.73% from other races, and 1.49% from two or more races. Hispanic or Latino of any race were 1.92%.

Of the 6,026 households 29.3% had children under the age of 18 living with them, 55.4% were married couples living together, 10.9% had a female householder with no husband present, and 30.2% were non-families. 26.6% of households were one person and 10.4% were one person aged 65 or older. The average household size was 2.48 and the average family size was 3.00.

The age distribution was 23.4% under the age of 18, 7.3% from 18 to 24, 29.1% from 25 to 44, 23.8% from 45 to 64, and 16.4% 65 or older. The median age was 39 years. For every 100 females age 18 and over, there were 89.2 males.

The median household income was $49,131 and the median family income  was $56,161. Males had a median income of $38,287 versus $27,218 for females. The per capita income for the city was $22,614. About 4.2% of families and 5.9% of the population were below the poverty line, including 8.7% of those under age 18 and 6.1% of those age 65 or over.

Education
Three elementary/middle school districts serve Fairview Heights: Grant-Illini District 110 covers the west side of the community, and Pontiac William Holliday School District 105 covers the east side of town.  A small portion on the northeast corner of the community is covered by O'Fallon District 90 and another portion on the far western edge is served by East St. Louis District 189. 
Trade colleges in Fairview Heights, IL include the Regency Beauty Institute and Vatterott College.

References

External links
 City of Fairview Heights

Cities in Illinois
Cities in St. Clair County, Illinois